Blue California  is a Southern California, United States, nature-based ingredient manufacturer of highly purity botanical extracts and specialty ingredients produced via fermentation through a proprietary bioconversion process.

Blue California's facility produces non-irradiated ingredients using steam and ozone sterilization. There are more than 550 Kosher-certified ingredients in the product line.

Ingredients
 Vita Panax

Notes and references

 "Blue California To Offer Rebaudioside A, a Purified Stevia Compound. November 13, 2007." https://web.archive.org/web/20080217211612/http://bluecal-ingredients.com/whatsnew/pr_20071113.php
 "US firm claims cheap, industrial stevia production. November 15, 2007." http://www.foodnavigator-usa.com/news/ng.asp?n=81404-blue-california-stevia-sweetener
 "Phytosterols Out of the Blue. October 10, 2004." http://www.foodprocessing.com/vendors/products/2007/021.html
 "Food Technology & Innovation 2008 Sponsors" https://web.archive.org/web/20080101193151/http://www.foodinnovatena.com/suppliers_conf.asp

Food manufacturers of the United States
Companies based in Orange County, California